Yasmine Niazy (born October 12, 1985 in Al Giza) is an Egyptian pop singer. She graduated from the National Conservatory, Cairo.

Discography
 2009 Shaklak Htouhshny (شكلك هاتوحشني) It seems that I will miss you Rotana Records
 2011 Hobak Amel Saytara (حبك عامل سيطره) "Your love has control" Rotana Records

References

External links
 Yasmine Niazy Official WebSite

1985 births
21st-century Egyptian women singers
Living people
People from Giza